Landing Ship, Tank (Hospital) (LSTH) was a conversion of a LST designed to act as a hospital ship, but because they retained armament were not officially designated as such. The Tank Landing Ship (LST) was a vessel designed to beach itself and unload equipment, vehicles, tanks, and troops onto an enemy beach.  The general idea of a LSTH would be to bring troops to shore, but the convenience of a ship beached ashore proved to be an inviting harbor for the sick and injured, who could simply walk aboard.

Background
On D-Day most of the troops were not landed by LSTs, however 41,035 wounded were brought back on approximately 150 LSTs, which was twice their troop capacity.  The sheer numbers overwhelmed the modest sick bay facilities on these craft which were staffed by one or two Pharmacist Mates.  The troop's berthing quickly filled to capacity with walking wounded and litter patients laid on the tank deck.  Further, the inclusion of refugees on LSTs created additional needs, such as an Italian woman who gave birth at sea.

Augmenting LSTs
Future operations in the Pacific sought to reduce these problems by augmenting several LSTs with a surgical teams to treat unstable patients. Occasionally referred to as LST Hospitals, these surgically augmented LSTs carried troops into battle and upon unloading set up the well deck into an organized hospital.  During the battles of Tarawa, Iwo Jima, Philippines, and Okinawa, surgical teams consisting of at first three and then five physicians as well as 35 Pharmacist Mates were attached to LSTs.

Designation of LST as hospitals
In preparation for Operation Olympic, the initial invasion of Japan planned for 1 November 1945, 36 LSTs were to be redesignated LSTHs.  These ships were to be augmented with a surgical team and provided large amounts of consumable and medical personnel to meet the anticipated demand for beachhead casualty evacuation.  The official written order for redesignation took effect September 15, 1945, 13 days after the end of the war. All 36 LSTHs were assigned duty in Asia and the Far East, but their designation served merely a formality as their new mission was to return US troops.  Although many did receive a large contingent of Pharmacist Mates by the months end.  By the end of May 1946, the last three LSTHs departed the Far East as part of the Magic Carpet fleet. Of the LSTs, one ship was converted to a "first aid ship" at the discretion of Vice Admiral Daniel E. Barbey, USN, Commander 7th Amphibious Force during 1943.

Refitting the LSTH

 was converted at Sydney in 1943 into a dedicated "first-aid ship", the only one of her kind used. LST-464 carried no troops, or combat equipment and functioned as a casualty evacuation ship during invasion, a station hospital ship in port, and an ambulance ship to transfer patients to a base hospital.  She was designated only by  numbers "464" painted on her hull amidships.

Her modified tank deck refitted and housed a complete and fixed hospital facility which extended into the ship through new water tight doors on port and starboard sides of the tank deck.  The tank deck, now hospital, bolstered a receiving or triage area, 78 hospital beds and accommodations (washrooms, toilets, increased galley), refrigerators, and a surgical suite.   The ship was equipped with specialist consultation and out-patient care at all times, including: radiology, pharmacy, laboratory, eye refractions, dental care, a blood bank, and stores for 25 tons of medical supplies.  Staff was increased to 6 physicians, one dentist and a complement of corpsmen.  During Normandy most LSTs had one or two Corpsmen.  Above deck she looked as any other LST and because of her armament she was not considered as a hospital ship in compliance with the Geneva Convention.  

Following the surrender of Japan, LST-464 was redesignated LST(H)-464 on 15 September 

Later, during the Vietnam War, the  tested the idea of hoisting and opening a MUST (Medical Unit Self-contained Transportable). The idea of a MUST was to allow an LST to set up complete hospital facilities after unloading troops.  The idea was to provide in-close support hospital facilities in a combat zone.

Other LSTHs

 LSTH-19
 LSTH-23
 LSTH-38
 LSTH-41
 LSTH-42
 LSTH-84
 LSTH-117
 LSTH-118
 LSTH-121
 LSTH-123
 LSTH-205
 LSTH-213
 LSTH-222
 LSTH-242
 LSTH-243
 LSTH-247
 LSTH-268
 LSTH-276
 LSTH-450
 LSTH-464
 LSTH-477
 LSTH-482
 LSTH-486
 LSTH-488
 LSTH-652
 LSTH-731
 LSTH-790
 LSTH-871
 LSTH-929
 LSTH-930
 LSTH-931
 LSTH-949
 LSTH-950
 LSTH-951
 LSTH-952
 LSTH-1033

See also
 List of United States Navy hospital ships
 List of United States Navy LSTs

References

Ship types
Tank landing ships